The Acero class is a ship class of nine patrol gunboats currently or incoming service with the Philippine Navy.

History
In 2019, the Philippine Navy raised a requirement to procure a new class of coastal patrol interdiction craft (CPIC) that would be missile-capable and are based on Israel's Shaldag V patrol boat design, and would replace the Tomas Batilo-class fast attack crafts that have been retired in service.

Israel Shipyards Ltd. has been offering the Shaldag V design to the Philippine Navy since 2016, but the proposal was not given too much attention as funding has not been made available only until after a few years later.

The Israeli design was proven to be more capable as an interdiction craft than the smaller Multi-Purpose Attack Craft that were originally designed by a Taiwanese shipbuilder as a troop insertion assault boat, and modified in Philippine Navy service to be used as a small missile boat. Thus, when the Philippine Navy raised the requirement for a Fast Attack Interdiction Craft (FAIC), the Philippines' Department of National Defense (DND) made a decision to procure them based on the Israeli proposal, and would be acquired under a Government-to-Government (G2G) deal with Israel.

A contract was signed between the (DND), Israel Shipyards Ltd. and Israeli Ministry of Defense on 9 February 2021, with the Notice to Proceed to start the effectivity of the contract released on 27 April 2021.

The first boat of the class, the BRP Nestor Acero (PG-901), was launched on 27 June 2022, and became the basis for the class' name. The hull number's use of "PG" indicates that the boats are classified as Patrol Gunboats based on Philippine Navy's naming classification standards.

In November 2022, the Philippine Navy's Flag Officer in Command Rear Admiral Toribio Acaci indicated that the service plans to acquire a total of 15 more Acero-class / Shaldag Mk. V patrol gunboats in the near future.

Technical Details
The ship class was designed to carry one bow-mounted Mk.44 Bushmaster II autocannon mounted on Rafael Typhoon Mk 30-C remote-controlled weapon station, and two M2HB Browning 12.7 mm/50-cal. heavy machine guns mounted on Rafael Mini Typhoon remote-controlled weapon stations.

At least four of the ships would be installed with a Rafael Typhoon MLS-NLOS missile launcher for Spike-NLOS surface-to-surface missiles, although all other boats are fitted for but not with the system, and can be installed separately at any time.

A 5.2-meter rigid inflatable boat (RHIB) is stowed in the aft, and is deployed using a 1,000-kilogram crane.

Ships in Class

Gallery

References

Patrol vessels of the Philippine Navy
Patrol boat classes